"The Right Combination" is a song by Japanese pop star Seiko and American pop singer Donnie Wahlberg. The song was released in June 1990 and peaked at number 22 in Japan, number 54 in the US, and number 44 in the UK. It also peaked at number 11 in Australia, where it was certified gold.

Track listing
CD single (656083-7)

Charts

Weekly charts

Year-end charts

Certifications

References

1990s ballads
1990 songs
1990 singles
Seiko Matsuda songs
Male–female vocal duets
Pop ballads
Columbia Records singles
Song recordings produced by Maurice Starr